This is a list of online newspapers in Iceland, ordered by their rank on Alexa for Iceland:

References

Online newspapers
Online newspapers
Iceland, online